Enzo Alan Tomás Barrenechea (born 11 May 2001) is an Argentine professional footballer who plays as a midfielder for  club Juventus.

Career

Early career 
In his early years he plays in Newell's Old Boys. In summer 2019 he moved to Sion for €3.1 million. In winter 2020 he moved to Juventus U23 – the reserve team of Juventus – for the following season.

Juventus U23 
He made his debut with Juventus U23 on 25 October 2020 in the away win against Lucchese. On 22 May 2021, Barrenechea injured his ACL. On 20 February 2022, Barrenechea returned being after his injury coming on as a substitute in the 59th minute against Seregno drawn 2–2. On 2 April, Barrenechea scored his first goal in his career in a 1–1 draw against Virtus Verona. On 21 May, Barrenechea scored the 12th-minute decider in the second leg of the second round of the play-offs national phases in a match won 1–0 against Padova, which did not prevent Juventus from being eliminated from the play-offs.

Style of play 
Defensive midfielder compared to Pogba and Nzonzi.

Career statistics

Club

References

Notelist

External links 
 

2001 births
Living people
Argentine footballers
Argentine expatriate footballers
Association football midfielders
Serie C players
Newell's Old Boys footballers
FC Sion players
Juventus F.C. players
Juventus Next Gen players
Argentine expatriate sportspeople in Switzerland
Expatriate footballers in Switzerland
Argentine expatriate sportspeople in Italy
Expatriate footballers in Italy
Sportspeople from Córdoba Province, Argentina
People from Villa María